June Arnold (October 27, 1926 – March 11, 1982) was an American novelist and publisher, known for her novel Sister Gin and the posthumous novel Baby Houston. Arnold's writing, such as Sister Gin, and the books she published through her press, Daughters, Incorporated, focused on telling the stories of lesbian lives and relationships.

Early life
Arnold was born June Fairfax Davis on October 27, 1926, to Robert Cowan Davis and Catherine ("Cad") Carter Wortham in Greenville, South Carolina. The family spent ten years in Memphis and then moved to Houston after the death of Robert Cowan Davis. She went to Kincaid School in Houston, Texas, before going to Shipley in Bryn Mawr, Pennsylvania. She spent her first college year at Vassar and then transferred to Rice, earning her B.A. from Rice Institute (now Rice University) in Houston in 1948, and went on to earn her M.A. in literature from Rice in 1958. In 1953, she married Gilbert Arnold, a classmate at Rice. The couple had five children. They divorced in 1959 and June married Sarel Eimerl and moved her children to NYC after the accidental drowning of one of her children. She divorced Eimerl within a year after their marriage. June Arnold moved her children to Greenwich Village, where she pursued her writing career and continued raising her four children outside the confines of Houston society and the status quo.

Career
Arnold's first novel, Applesauce, was published in 1966 by McGraw Hill. It explored how people's personalities change after motherhood and marriage.

In 1971, June Arnold founded Daughters, Incorporated with her partner Parke Bowman. Daughters, Inc. published several books, many focusing on gender and lesbian experiences, including Lois Gould's X: A Fabulous Child's Story, Rita Mae Brown's Rubyfruit Jungle, and Arnold's novels.

Arnold's second novel, The Cook and the Carpenter, was published in 1973. It was followed by Sister Gin in 1975, a novel about Su, a 46-year-old woman whose carefully constructed life seemingly falls apart at the onset of menopause. Su struggles to write a play, keep her life together, leave her partner of 20 years, Bettina, all while drinking copious amounts of "Sister Gin."

In addition to founding Daughters, Inc. and publishing three novels during her life, Arnold helped organize the first Women in Print Conference. She also contributed to publications such as Sinister Wisdom, Village Voice and Sister Courage.

Before her death, she was working on a novel based on the life of her mother. Arnold died of cancer on March 11, 1982, in Houston, before her book could be published. It was released in 1987 as Baby Houston.

References 

American lesbian writers
Writers from Houston
Rice University alumni
American publishers (people)
1926 births
1982 deaths
20th-century American women writers
20th-century American writers
Shipley School alumni
20th-century American LGBT people